José Ramón "Txerra" Rodríguez Gómez (born 17 July 1987), commonly known as José Ramón, is a Spanish footballer who plays for CD Calahorra as a goalkeeper.

Club career
Born in Huelva, Andalusia, José Ramón finished his formation with local Recreativo de Huelva, making his senior debuts with the reserves in the 2005–06 season. On 18 June 2006 he played his first game as a professional, starting in a 2–0 away win against Hércules CF in the Segunda División.

In the following years José Ramón played in Segunda División B, representing Cultural y Deportiva Leonesa, Celta de Vigo B, Écija Balompié, CD San Roque de Lepe, SD Noja, Lucena CF and Barakaldo CF.

References

External links

1987 births
Living people
Footballers from Huelva
Spanish footballers
Association football goalkeepers
Segunda División players
Segunda División B players
Tercera División players
Atlético Onubense players
Recreativo de Huelva players
Cultural Leonesa footballers
Celta de Vigo B players
Écija Balompié players
CD San Roque de Lepe footballers
Lucena CF players
Barakaldo CF footballers